Shuah is the name of one of four minor Biblical figures.  It is sometimes used as the name of a fifth.  Their names are different in Hebrew, but they were all transliterated as "Shuah" in the King James Version.

Genesis 25

Shuah (Hebrew: שׁוּחַ, pronounced "Shuakh", "ditch; swimming; humiliation" or "sinks down") was the sixth son of Abraham (the patriarch of the Israelites) and Keturah, whom Abraham had wed after the death of Sarah. He was the youngest of Keturah's sons; the others were Zimran, Jokshan, Medan, Midian, and Ishbak.

Shuah in Greek is Σωυε, transliterated Soie. Josephus gave his name as Σοῦος (Sous in Whiston's translation).

Josephus writes of the brothers that "Abraham contrived to settle them in colonies; and they took possession of Troglodytis, and the country of Arabia Felix, as far as it reaches to the Red Sea." But unlike his brothers, Shuah seems to have turned northward and travelled into northern Mesopotamia, in what is now the northern region of modern-day Syria. As evidenced by cuneiform texts, the land seems to have been named after him, being known as the land of Sûchu which lies to the south of ancient Hittite capital of Carchemish on the Euphrates river.

The Bible also records that Job's friend Bildad was a Shuhite.

Genesis 38

Shuah or Shua (Hebrew: שׁוּעַ, pronounced "Shuaʿ", with an ayin glottal stop at the end, "opulence" or "cry for help") was a certain Canaanite, whose unnamed daughter marries Judah.  He was thereby also the grandfather of Er, Onan, Shelah.

The Targum translates "Canaanite man" as "merchant", and Rashi refers to this.  In the Talmud, Pesachim 50a, there is a discussion explaining this translation.

In the King James Version, Genesis 38:2 reads "And Judah saw there a daughter of a certain Canaanite, whose name was Shuah ..." This is ambiguous as to who is named Shuah, the Canaanite or his daughter.  This has led some to say that Shuah was Judah's wife.

The Septuagint is explicit that Sava is the daughter of the Canaanite man and the wife of Judah.

The reference to Judah's wife in Genesis 38:12 refers to her as the "daughter of Shuah", or "bat-Shuah" in Hebrew.  This has led some to take Bat-Shuah (and variants) as her actual name. A midrashic tradition says her name was Aliyath. Bat-Shuah is also an alternative name for Bathsheba, wife of Judah's descendant, King David.

1 Chronicles 4

Shuah or Shuhah (Hebrew: שׁוּחָה, pronounced "Shukhah") is a descendant of Judah.  No gender or father is named, just a brother Chelub and his descendants. Ralbag in his commentary says that Shuhah is the same as Hushah (חוּשָׁה) listed earlier in the genealogy.  Nave says Shuhah is "probably the same" as Hushah.

Shuah in Greek is ᾿Ασχὰ, transliterated Ascha.  The Septuagint states that Chaleb is Ascha's father.

1 Chronicles 7

Shuah or Shua (Hebrew: שׁוּעָא, pronounced "Shuʿa", with an ayin glottal stop in the middle, "wealth") was a great-granddaughter of Asher.  She was the daughter of Heber, who was a son of Beriah, a son of Asher.  Her brothers were Japhlet, Shomer, and Hotham.

Shuah in Greek is Σωλὰ, transliterated Sola.

References

Book of Genesis people
Books of Chronicles people
Children of Abraham
Canaanite people
Set index articles on Hebrew Bible people